Brookview is an unincorporated community located within East Brunswick Township in Middlesex County, New Jersey, United States. The settlement is located along Church Lane at the former Newark–Trenton Fast Line right-of-way, now a PSE&G transmission line corridor. The Brookview Volunteer Fire Company, established in 1952, takes its name from the settlement.

References

East Brunswick, New Jersey
Unincorporated communities in Middlesex County, New Jersey
Unincorporated communities in New Jersey